John Kendrick Skinner VC, DCM (5 February 1883 – 17 March 1918) was a Scottish recipient of the Victoria Cross, the highest and most prestigious award for gallantry in the face of the enemy that can be awarded to British and Commonwealth forces.

Skinner was born in Shore Street, Inver, near Tain to Walter C. Skinner, a tailor's cutter, and Mary Skinner née Kendrick. He was educated at Queen's Park Higher Grade School and Allan Glen's School in the city.

Skinner was an acting Company Sergeant Major in the 1st Battalion, The King's Own Scottish Borderers, British Army, when he became the recipient of the Victoria Cross for his actions during the Battle of Passchendaele on 18 August 1917 at Wijdendrift, Belgium.

His citation reads:

C.S.M Skinner received the medal from King George V at an investiture in Buckingham Palace on 26 September 1917. Following the investiture he was granted the customary fourteen days' leave after which he was posted to the Reserve Battalion in Edinburgh. A few days later, however, he was seen in the line, having risked a court-martial to return to his men.

His pallbearers were six fellow-VCs with three others in attendance.

His Victoria Cross is displayed at the Regimental Museum of The Kings Own Scottish Borderers, in Berwick Barracks, Berwick upon Tweed, Northumberland, England.

References

Sources
Monuments to Courage (David Harvey, 1999)
The Register of the Victoria Cross (This England, 1997)
Scotland's Forgotten Valour (Graham Ross, 1995)

External links
 
 Profile at pollokshieldsheritage.org
 http://warmemscot.s4.bizhat.com/warmemscot-post-53330.html

1883 births
1918 deaths
Scottish military personnel
British Army personnel of the Second Boer War
British Army personnel of World War I
British military personnel killed in World War I
British World War I recipients of the Victoria Cross
Recipients of the Croix de Guerre 1914–1918 (France)
King's Own Scottish Borderers soldiers
Military personnel from Glasgow
Recipients of the Distinguished Conduct Medal
British Army recipients of the Victoria Cross
People educated at Allan Glen's School
Pollokshields